The nominees for the 2014 Ovation Awards, aka the 25th Annual LA STAGE Alliance Ovation Awards, were announced on September 22, 2014, at the Autry National Center in Los Angeles, California. The awards were presented for excellence in stage productions in the Los Angeles area from September 2013 to August 2014 based upon evaluations from 250 members of the Los Angeles theater community.

The winners were announced on November 2, 2014, in a ceremony at the San Gabriel Mission Playhouse in San Gabriel, California. The ceremony was hosted by actresses Kate Burton and Katie Lowes.

Awards 
Winners are listed first and highlighted in boldface.

Ovation Honors 

Ovation Honors, which recognize outstanding achievement in areas that are not among the standard list of nomination categories, were presented when the nominations were announced.

 Composition for a Play – Dave Robbins – A Midsummer Night's Dream – Actors' Gang
 Fight Choreography – Ahmed Best – Backyard – The Echo Theater Company
 Puppet Design – Michelle Zamora – Roald Dahl's The Magic Finger – Mainstreet Theatre Company

References 

Ovation Awards
Ovation
2014 in California
Ovation